Ženski rukometni klub Mira Prijedor is a women's handball club from Prijedor in Bosnia and Herzegovina. It currently competes in the Premier League, the top tier volleyball league of Bosnia and Herzegovina.

Honours 
Handball Championship of Bosnia and Herzegovina: 
Winners (1): 2014

European record

Recent seasons

The recent season-by-season performance of the club:

References

External links
 Official website
 EHF Club profile

Mira, ŽRK
Prijedor